Kleberg County is a county in the U.S. state of Texas. As of the 2020 census, its population was 31,040. The county seat is Kingsville. The county was organized in 1913 and is named for Robert J. Kleberg, an early settler.

Kleberg County is part of the Kingsville, TX Micropolitan Statistical Area, which is also part of the Corpus Christi-Kingsville-Alice, TX Combined Statistical Area. Most of the county's land lies in the famed King Ranch, which also extends into neighboring counties.

History

The county was organized in 1913 and was named for Robert J. Kleberg, an early settler (see below).

In 1997, the county commissioners officially designated "heaven-o" as the county's greeting.  The stated reason was that "hello" contains the word "hell".

Geography
It borders the Gulf of Mexico. Baffin Bay makes up a large part of the border with Kenedy County.

Major highways
  U.S. Highway 77
  Interstate 69E is currently under construction and will follow the current route of U.S. 77 in most places.
  State Highway 141
  State Highway 285
  Farm to Market Road 771
  Park Road 22

Adjacent counties
 Nueces County (north)
 Kenedy County (south)
 Brooks County (southwest)
 Jim Wells County (west)

National protected area
 Padre Island National Seashore (part)

Demographics

2020 census

Note: the US Census treats Hispanic/Latino as an ethnic category. This table excludes Latinos from the racial categories and assigns them to a separate category. Hispanics/Latinos can be of any race.

2000 Census
As of the census of 2000, there were 31,549 people, 10,896 households, and 7,681 families residing in the county.  The population density was 36 people per square mile (14/km2).  There were 12,743 housing units at an average density of 15 per square mile (6/km2).  The racial makeup of the county was 71.87% White, 3.70% Black or African American, 0.61% Native American, 1.47% Asian, 0.10% Pacific Islander, 19.00% from other races, and 3.25% from two or more races.  65.41% of the population were Hispanic or Latino of any race.

There were 10,896 households, out of which 34.90% had children under the age of 18 living with them, 52.10% were married couples living together, 13.90% had a female householder with no husband present, and 29.50% were non-families. 22.30% of all households were made up of individuals, and 7.60% had someone living alone who was 65 years of age or older.  The average household size was 2.78 and the average family size was 3.30.

In the county, the population was spread out, with 27.30% under the age of 18, 15.70% from 18 to 24, 27.40% from 25 to 44, 19.00% from 45 to 64, and 10.60% who were 65 years of age or older.  The median age was 29 years. For every 100 females, there were 101.00 males.  For every 100 females age 18 and over, there were 98.50 males.

The median income for a household in the county was $29,313, and the median income for a family was $33,055. Males had a median income of $31,179 versus $19,494 for females. The per capita income for the county was $13,542.  About 21.20% of families and 26.70% of the population were below the poverty line, including 35.50% of those under age 18 and 15.60% of those age 65 or over.

Robert Justus Kleberg
Kleberg county is named after Robert Justus Kleberg Sr. (1803–1888), a Prussian settler, was born on September 10, 1803, in Herstelle, Westphalia.
His father was a merchant. Kleberg was educated in the classics and attended the University of Göttingen, where he received a J.D. degree. After graduating he was appointed a justice of assizes. He married Rosalie von Roeder near Paderborn, Prussia, in ...1834.
They emigrated to Texas that year and settled in Cat Spring in 1836. In the Republic of Texas, Kleberg was associate commissioner and president of the Board of Land Commissioners (1837–38), justice of the peace (1841), and chief justice of Austin County (1846). In 1847 the Kleberg's moved to Meyersville, where Kleberg was elected county commissioner in 1848 and chief justice in 1853.
Kleberg fought in the battle of San Jacinto in Capt. Moseley Baker's company and subsequently served as one of the Texas guards for Gen. Santa Anna. After the revolution, he volunteered for six months' duty in the Texas army in a campaign against the Indians on Escondido Creek.
Kleberg supported the cause of the Confederacy. When the Civil War broke out he raised a company of militia but because of his advanced age was not received into active service. Robert and Rosa raised their own seven children in addition to several young Roeder relatives. Their youngest son, Robert Justus Kleberg Jr. married Alice Gertrudis King.
Kleberg died on October 23, 1888, near Cuero and was buried there. His grave is marked by a monument in the form of a soldier's tent with the words "Remember the Alamo" carved at the base. Kleberg County was named in his honor in 1913; a marker at his home site near Cuero was erected in 1936.

Communities

Cities and towns
 Kingsville (county seat)

Census-designated places
 Ricardo
 Riviera

Unincorporated community
 Loyola Beach

Politics
Kleberg County is represented in the Texas House of Representatives by the Republican J. M. Lozano, a restaurateur in Kingsville and in Alice, Texas.
Kleberg County has leaned Democratic for most of its history, but has become more competitive in the 21st century, voting thrice for either narrowly-winning or losing Republicans (George W. Bush in 2000 and 2004, and Donald Trump in 2020).

Education
School districts include:
 Kingsville Independent School District
 Ricardo Independent School District
 Riviera Independent School District
 Santa Gertrudis Independent School District

Coastal Bend College (formerly Bee County College) is the designated community college for the Kingsville, Ricardo, and Santa Gertrudis school district areas. The Riviera ISD portion is in the Del Mar College-Corpus Christi Junior College District.

See also

 List of museums in the Texas Gulf Coast
 National Register of Historic Places listings in Kleberg County, Texas
 Recorded Texas Historic Landmarks in Kleberg County

References

External links
 Kleberg County government's website
 
 Kleberg County Airport website
 Kleberg County Sheriff's Office

 
Kingsville, Texas micropolitan area
1913 establishments in Texas
Populated places established in 1913
 
Majority-minority counties in Texas